ASL Airlines Hungary Flight 7332 was a cargo flight operating for DHL from Paris–Charles de Gaulle Airport, France, to Bergamo Orio al Serio Airport, Italy. On 5 August 2016, the aircraft overran the runway while landing at Bergamo in poor weather and came to rest on a nearby road. The airport was closed for almost three hours after the crash, and flights were rescheduled or rerouted to Malpensa Airport. The two-person crew was not injured.

Damages

The plane landed approximately  into the  runway 28, and did not stop until more than  beyond the end of the runway. It broke through the airport perimeter fence and rolled onto an active four-lane highway, with some vehicles narrowly escaping a collision and others in the adjacent parking lot being destroyed in the process. The aircraft left a long trail of destruction as it rolled off from the runway.

It sustained substantial damage, losing its CFM56 engines and main landing gear, and fracturing the horizontal stabilizer.

Investigation
Italian air investigation agency ANSV began an inquiry into the accident. The CVR and DFDR were retrieved on the day of the accident. A preliminary report was released on 21 September 2016.
The final report, released in August 2018, concluded that the accident was mainly caused by the loss of situation awareness of the crew.

References

External links
 Relazione
 Preliminary report
 Final report 

Aviation accidents and incidents in 2016
Aviation accidents and incidents in Italy
2016 in Italy
2016 disasters in Italy
August 2016 events in Italy
Accidents and incidents involving the Boeing 737 Classic